Melanochroa may refer to three different insect genera:
 Melanochroa Brauer, 1882, a synonym for Nothomyia, a genus of flies
 Melanochroa Broun, 1882, a synonym for Cyclaxyra, a genus of beetles
 Melanochroa Roeder, 1886, a synonym for Nothomyia, a genus of flies
 Melanochroa Yoshiyasu, 1985, a synonym for Yoshiyasua, a genus of moths